Balkanabat Airport , also known as Nebit Dag Airport, is a provincial airport located  southeast of Balkanabat in Turkmenistan. An opening ceremony of the new airport terminal was held on 7 November 2004. The terminal building is spread over 3,500 square metres and has a capacity of 200 passengers per hour. The runway can handle aircraft weighing up to 150 tonnes.

Airlines and destinations
Scheduled flights are not operated.

References

Airports in Turkmenistan